Frank Herman Lange (October 28, 1883 – December 26, 1945) was a pitcher and pinch hitter in Major League Baseball. He played for the Chicago White Sox.

Lange died in a hospital in Madison, Wisconsin.

References

External links

1883 births
1945 deaths
Major League Baseball pitchers
Chicago White Sox players
Wausau Lumberjacks players
Des Moines Boosters players
Baseball players from Wisconsin
People from Columbus, Wisconsin